The following is a list of people who were born in, have lived in, or are otherwise associated with American city of Sedalia, Missouri; they are known as Sedalians. In addition to what follows, a list of more than fifty Sedalia "Old Timers", who had met at the Sedalia Courthouse on the previous evening, was published in the December 12, 1893, issue of the Sedalia Bazoo; the list indicated when they had arrived in Sedalia, and from whence they had come.

Arts

Acting 

 Dorothy Dwan (1906–1981) – film actress
 Lucille McVey (1890–1925) – film screenwriter and silent film actress; married to Sidney Drew in 1914; often credited under married name of Mrs. Sidney Drew; through marriage, aunt to John, Lionel and Ethel Barrymore
 Jack Oakie, born Lewis Delaney Offield (1903–1978) – film, stage, radio, and television actor

Comedy

Literature 

 Charles G. Finney – US Army veteran, novelist and author of The Circus of Dr. Lao among others, and copy editor of the Arizona Daily Star. 
 Joel Townsley Rogers (1896–1984) – short-story writer; mystery novelist
 June Rae Wood (born 1946) – children's and young adult's author

Music 

 Scott Hayden (1882–1915) – composer of ragtime music
 Scott Joplin (1867/1868–1917) – musician and composer of ragtime music
 L. Viola Kinney (c.1890 – 1945) – composer, pianist, and music educator
 Arthur Marshall (1881–1968) – composer and performer of ragtime music
 Etilmon Justus Stark (1868–1962) – ragtime composer and arranger
 John Stillwell Stark (1841–1927) – piano dealer; publisher of ragtime music; promoter of Scott Joplin
 Leroy Van Dyke (born 1929) – country music performer; wrote "The Auctioneer" and recorded "Walk on By"; recorded over 500 songs
Gene Watts, trombonist and co-founder of Canadian Brass

Education 

 Winona Cargile Alexander (1893–1984) – founder, Delta Sigma Theta sorority; high-school teacher; social worker

Science and engineering 

 Daniel C. Jackling (1869–1956) – mining and metallurgical engineer; founder, Utah Copper Company; known as "the father of open-pit mining"
 Walter Rautenstrauch (1880–1951) – mechanical engineer; first chairman of Columbia University's Department of Industrial Engineering; adviser to the Mexican Government; co-founder of Committee on Technocracy (1932)

Historical figures 

 Clay Allison (1840–1887) – gunfighter, American Old West

Journalism 

 Raymond Peter Brandt (1896–1974) – Rhodes Scholar; O.I.C. Office of Finances, American Relief Administration, Vienna, Austria, 1920; District Supervisor, American Relief Administration, Vitebsk, Russia, (1922–1923); reporter, St. Louis Post-Dispatch (1917–1919), and Washington, D.C. correspondent for the St. Louis Post-Dispatch (1923–1967)
 Elizabeth Williams Cosgrove (1878–1975), journalist; writer; poet
 Elizabeth Jane Dugan (?1848–1911) – also known as "Rosa Pearle"; poet; journalist (started with the Sedalia Bazoo; founder and editor of the Saturday-evening society weekly Rosa Pearle's Paper (1894–1911)
 Mary Frances "Murry" Engle (1930–2005) – journalist, Sedalia Democrat (1950–1966), Boeing News and Boeing Magazine (1967–1970); Honolulu Star-Bulletin (1970–1993)
 Charles Grandison Finney (1905–1984) – journalist; writer; part-time night club owner; author, The Circus of Dr. Lao, which adapted as the film 7 Faces of Dr. Lao (1964)
 Hazel Norinne Lang (1903–1996) – journalist, reporter and feature writer with the Sedalia Democrat (1925–1970); poet; historian (author of Only Human; Poems of Everyday Life, Exposition Press, (New York), 1955, and the 1,112-page Life in Pettis County, 1815–1873, published in Sedalia, in 1975)
 Casper Salathiel Yost (1863–1941) – editor of St. Louis Globe-Democrat; founder of American Society of Newspaper Editors (1922)

Medicine 

 Walter Edward Dandy (1886–1946) – scientist and neurosurgeon
 Willis P. King – president, Missouri State Medical Association (1881)
 Thomas J. Montgomery – vice-president, Missouri State Medical Association (1874)
 John W. Trader – president, Missouri State Medical Association (1876)

Military

United States Army 

 Richard D. Dean (born 1929) – United States Army Brigadier General and Deputy Director of the Army National Guard
 Rufus Estes Longan (1879–1936) – Brigadier General, United States Army
 John C. McLaughlin (1903–1967) – Major General, United States Army, 35th Infantry Division
 John Henry Parker – Brigadier General, United States Army; West Point Graduate; war hero; first to recognize the tactical advantages of machine guns to continuously support advancing infantry and protect artillery trains (carriages pulled by draft animals); awarded the Distinguished Service Cross four times, for valor displayed on four separate occasions, during 1918
 Edgar Frank Thelen (born 1906) – University of Missouri graduate; associate of Harry S. Truman in the Reserve Officers' Training Corps (1930–1940); US Army officer (1942–1961); staff member, University of Missouri
 William S. Triplet (1900–1994) – Colonel United States Army; professional soldier; West Point graduate (1924); served in both World War I and World War II

United States Air Force 

 James Phillip Fleming (born 1943) – United States Air Force pilot in the Vietnam War; awarded Medal of Honor for bravery
 Arthur G. Salisbury (1916–2005) – Major General, USAF
 George Allison Whiteman – first USAF airman killed in World War II; killed when attempting to get his plane off the ground at Pearl Harbor on December 7, 1941; in 1955, Sedalia Air Force Base was renamed Whiteman Air Force Base in his honor

Other 

 William Gentry (1818–1890) – Major in the 40th Enrolled Missouri Militia; livestock farmer; railroad executive; candidate for Governor (1874)

Politics and government

Heads of state and heads of government 

Emmet Montgomery Reily (1866–1954) – journalist; politician; Governor of Puerto Rico (1921–1923)
 Charles Emmett Yeater (1861–1943) – graduate of the University of Missouri; acting Governor-General of the Philippines (March 5, 1921 – October 14, 1921)

Diplomats 

 John Flournoy Montgomery (1878–1954) – United States Ambassador to Hungary (1933–1941)

Politicians 

 John Homer Bothwell (1849–1929) – lawyer; politician; member of the 35th and 38th General Assemblies of the Missouri legislature (1889 and 1895)
 John Morgan Evans (1863–1946) – U.S. Congressman (1913–1921; 1923–1933)
 Thomas Jefferson Halsey (1863–1951) – teacher; businessman; U.S. Congressman (1929–1931)
 Judith K. Moriarty (born 1942) – politician; Missouri Secretary of State (1993–1994)
 John William Palmer (1866–1958) – physician; lawyer; U.S. Congressman (1929–1931)
 John Berchmans Sullivan (1897–1951) – lawyer; politician; U.S. Congressman (1941–1943; 1945–1947; 1949–1951)
 George Graham Vest (1830–1904) – orator; lawyer; politician; at his death, the last living Confederate States Senator; known for his "Eulogy on the Dog"
 Xenophon Pierce Wilfley (1871–1931) – teacher; lawyer; U.S. Senator (1918); president, Missouri Bar Association (1925)

Judiciary 

 Walter Henry Bohling (1888–1968) – Commissioner of the Supreme Court of Missouri (1934–1963)
 Henry Lamm (1846–1926) – lawyer; jurist; poet; Associate and Chief Justice of the Supreme Court of Missouri (1905–1916)
 Hazel Palmer – first female assistant prosecuting attorney in Sedalia, the first female county collector, and the first female magistrate judge of Pettis County; unsuccessful Republican candidate for the U.S. Senate in 1958; president, National Federation of Business and Professional Women (1956–1958)
 John Finis Philips (1834–1919) – lawyer; politician; colonel 7th Missouri Volunteer Cavalry; president, Missouri Press Association (1891); US Congressman; federal judge
 Donald J. Stohr (1934–2015) – United States District Court judge; was born in Sedalia.

Mayors of Sedalia 
On February 15, 1864, the Missouri General Assembly passed a bill granting Sedalia a city charter. The charter appointed the first city officers who served until elections were held in April 1864. The term of office for Mayor was one-year from 1864 to 1886; was two-years from 1886 to 1938; and four-years from 1938 until present. City municipal elections are held in April. 

The following have been mayors of Sedalia:

 1864-1864 – George Rappeen Smith (R) (1804–1879) appointed
 1864-1865 - James G. Tesch (R) (1831-1896)
 1865-1865 - E. W. Washburn (R) (1814-1899) resigned
 1865-1866 - F. L. Parker (R) (1834-1881)
 1866-1867 - John Finis Philips (R) (1834–1919)
 1867-1868 - Henry Suess (1837–1906)
 1868-1869 - Bacon Montgomery (1840–1886)
 1869-1870 - Albert Parker (1827-1895)
 1870-1871 - William P. Jackson (1830-1891)
 1871-1872 - Thomas J. Montgomery (D) (1812-1877)
 1872-1873 - George W. Cummings (D) (1838-1922)
 1873-1874 - R. T. Miller (D) (1831-1914)
 1874-1875 - William H. H. Hill (D) (1840-1880)
 1875-1876 - Norman Maltby (D) (1841–1876)
 1876-1877 - David Blocher (D) (1838-1906)
 1877-1878 - Logan Clark (D) (1820-1882)
 1878–1880 – George L. Faulhaber (R) (1838–1926)
 1880-1881 - E. C. Evans (D) (1828-1902)
 1881-1882 - Frank Craycroft (D) (1841-1911)
 1882–1884 – Charles E. Messerly (R) (1851-1938)
 1884–1886 – John B. Rickman (D) (1840-1915)
 1886–1888 – E. W. Stevens (D) (1846-1905)
 1888–1890 – John D. Crawford(R) (1838-1908)
 1890–1894 – E. W. Stevens (D) (1846-1905)
 1894–1898 – Pleasant Dawson Hastain (R) (1853-1912)
 1898–1900 – W. C. Overstreet (D) (1857-1916)
 1900–1901 – Samuel K. Crawford (R) (1838-1901) died in office
 1901–1906 – J. L. Babcock (R) (1861–1930)
 1906–1908 – John A. Collins (I)(1834-1924)
 1908–1910 – J. L. Babcock (R) (1861-1930)
 1910–1912 – J. W. Mellor (D) (1860-1930)
 1912–1914 – F. L. Ludemann (D) (1864-1941)
 1914–1918 – J. L. Babcock (R) (1861-1930)
 1918–1920 – A. L. Baumgartner (R) (1860-1933)
 1920–1924 – Frank F. Hatton (D) (1866-1925)
 1924–1928 – J. L. Babcock (R) (1861-1930)
 1928–1930 – O. B. Poundstone (D) (1885-1971)
 1930–1932 – Sidney B. Kennon (D) (1869-1938)
 1932–1934 – Wilmer Steeples (R)(1891–1946)
 1934–1935 – O. B. Poundstone (D) (1885-1971) resigned
 1935–1942 – Julian H. Bagby (D) (1899–1990) 
 1942–1946 – Alonzo H. Wilks (R) (1876-1966) 
 1946–1950 – Julian H. Bagby (D) (1899–1990) 
 1950–1953 – Herbert E. Studer (R) (1918-1958) resigned
 1954–1958 – Julian H. Bagby (D) 1899–1990) 
 1958–1962 – Abe Silverman (I) (1917-1999)
 1962-1966 - L. L. Studer (R) (1888-1967) 
 1966-1970 - Ralph H. Walker (R) (1932-2009)
 1970–1976 – Jerry N. Jones (R) (1937-2011) resigned
 1976–1982 – Allen L. Hawkins (R)
 1982–1988 – Larry G. Foster (R) resigned
 1989–1991 – Steven J. Dust (NP) resigned
 1991–2002 – Jane Gray (NP)
 2002–2009 – Bob Wasson (NP) (1933–2009) died in office
 2009–2014 – Elaine Horn (NP)
 2014-2018 - Stephen Galliher (NP)
 2018-Present - John Kehde (NP)

Sport

Baseball 

 Allen Conkwright (1896–1991) – fourth cousin of Oakland Raiders' coach Red Conkright; pitcher with the Detroit Tigers in the 1920 season
 Bill Drake (1895–1977) – pitcher in various Negro league baseball teams (1914–1927)
 Al Orth (1872–1948) – pitcher who won 200 games while playing for the Philadelphia Phillies, Washington Senators and New York Highlanders (1895-1909)
 John Tillman "Bud" Thomas (born 1929) – baseballer; infielder for the St. Louis Browns for the 1951 season
 Clarence LeRoy "Roy" Vaughn (born 1911) – baseballer; pitcher for the Philadelphia Athletics for the 1934 season

Basketball 

 Kim Anderson (born 1955) – basketball player and coach

Football 

 Douglas Claydon Van Horn (born 1944) – football offensive lineman in the National Football League (1966–1979)

Wrestling 

 Douglas A. "Ox" Baker (born 1934) – professional wrestler

Miscellaneous

Physical Culture
 Bernard Adolphus McFadden (later Macfadden) (1868–1955) – promoter of physical culture; advocate of fasting

Business
 E. Virgil Neal (1868–1949) – manufacturer, entrepreneur<ref>* Conroy, M.S. (2006), The Soviet Pharmaceutical Business During the First Two Decades (1917-1937), New York, NY: Peter Lang. ; Conroy, M.S. (2014), The Cosmetics Baron You’ve Never Heard Of: E. Virgil Neal and Tokalon (Third Edition), Englewood, CO: Altus History LLC. ; Yeates, Lindsay B. (2016), "Émile Coué and his Method (I): The Chemist of Thought and Human Action", Australian Journal of Clinical Hypnotherapy & Hypnosis, Volume 38, No.1, (Autumn 2016), pp. 3–27; "E. Virgil Neal Passes Away at Geneva on June 30", The Sedalia Democrat, (July 3, 1949), p.7.</ref>

See also

 List of people from Missouri

 References 

 Further reading 
 Christensen, L.O.(ed), Dictionary of Missouri Biography, University of Missouri Press, (Columbia), 1999. 
 Ihrig, B.B. et al. (eds), The First One Hundred Years, A History of the City of Sedalia, Missouri, 1860–1960, Centennial History Committee, Sedalia, 1960.
 Imhauser, R.C., Images of America: Sedalia, Arcadia Publishing, (Charleston), 2007. 
 Scotten, F.C., History of the Schools of Pettis County, Missouri, 1974; Prepared under the Direction of C. F. Scotten'', C.F. Scotton, (Sedalia) 1974.
 Bird, Kenneth L. "Rail to The Osage" The story of the Sedalia Warsaw & Southern Railroad, Menwith Publications,(Lincoln, Mo), 2009.

External links 
 
 Sedalia Convention and Visitors Bureau
 Sedalia Chamber of Commerce
 The Political Graveyard: A Database of Historic Cemeteries
 Sedalia Democrat, a daily newspaper

Sedalia, Missouri
Sedalia